Everywhere I Look is a 2016 collection of short works by Australian writer Helen Garner. It is published by Text Publishing. In review in The Irish Times, Irish novelist Evelyn Conlon wrote that "it thematic selection from 15 years of work, the pieces ranging from review length to essays to snapshots from Garner's diaries."

References

2016 non-fiction books
Text Publishing books